Tu Sueño Es Mi Sueño, Tu Grito Es Mi Canto (English: Your Dream Is My Dream, Your Cry Is My Song)  is the second and final studio album by the folk music group Amerindios.

Track listing 
 "El barco de papel"
 "Los colihues"
 "Mis raices heridas" (with Bernardo Dewers)
 "Los niños cuando niños"
 "Valparaiso 4 A.M. / Cueca beat"
 "A pie camino" 
 "¡No!" 
 "Mi rio"
 "Ahora"
 "Ni pocos, ni muchos"
 "La cervecita"
 "Sin nombre"

External links 
 Música Popular: Amerindios: Tu sueño es mi sueño, tu grito es mi canto

Amerindios albums
1973 albums